Virchandra Paswan  (born 1 July 1964) is a member of the 14th Lok Sabha of India between 2004 and 2009. He represented the Nawada constituency of Bihar as a member of the Rashtriya Janata Dal (RJD) political party. On 13 September 2013, he joined Bhartiya Janata Party (BJP).

He didn't contest the 15th Lok Sabha in 2009.

References

1964 births
Living people
India MPs 2004–2009
Bharatiya Janata Party politicians from Bihar
People from Nawada district
Lok Sabha members from Bihar
Rashtriya Janata Dal politicians
Janata Dal (United) politicians